was a Japanese photographer.

References

Japanese photographers
1901 births
1995 deaths